ATSC is the Advanced Television Systems Committee standards.

ATSC may also refer to:

 Advanced Television Systems Committee, the committee that wrote the ATSC Standards
 Acetone thiosemicarbazone, a chemical compound
 Air Technical Service Command, one of the many predecessors of the Air Force Materiel Command
 Army Training Support Center, a United States Army facility at Fort Eustis
 ATSC (UK) Ltd, the manufacturer of the fake ADE 651 bomb detection device